Redcurrant sauce, also known as redcurrant jelly, is an English condiment, consisting of redcurrants (Ribes rubrum), sugar and rosemary. Some other recipes include additional ingredients such as red wine, white wine, port, mustard, lemon or orange zest, and very occasionally shallots. The sauce is traditionally eaten as part of a Sunday roast, particularly with roast lamb, roast goose or roast turkey  and is an integral part of Christmas dinner in Britain.

The sauce is also a popular accompaniment to all types of game. It is very similar, if somewhat simpler than Cumberland and Oxford sauces that have port added to their constituents. The prominence that American food has gained within the last century has led to redcurrant sauce being partially replaced by cranberry sauce as the condiment of choice.

See also
 List of sauces
 Roast dinner

References

English cuisine
British condiments
Christmas food